Michaelsen is a Danish patronymic surname meaning "son of Michael".   There are related English, German, Norwegian, Swedish and other Scandinavian spellings of this name.  People with the name Michaelsen include:

People
 Gottfried Michaelsen, aka Gödeke Michels (d. 1402), German pirate
 Helena Iren Michaelsen, Norwegian singer
 Helle Michaelsen (b. 1968), Danish model, actress 
 Jacob Michaelsen, Denmark, Olympic bronze heavyweight
 Jan Michaelsen (b. 1970), Danish football player 
 Kari Michaelsen (b. 1961, née Kari Markusen), American actress
 Kirsten Michaelsen (b. 1943), Danish swimmer
 Lars Michaelsen (b. 1969), former Danish road bicycle racer 
 Melissa Michaelsen (b. 1968), American actress 
 Michael Michaelsen (1899–1970), Danish Olympics boxer
 Peter Michaelsen, inventor of Cannon shogi
 Peter Michaelsen (b. 1971), American actor, director, and producer also known as Peter Billingsley
 Wilhelm Michaelsen (1860–1937), German zoologist

See also
 Michaelson
 Michelsen
 Mickelson
 Mikkelsen

Danish-language surnames
Patronymic surnames
Surnames from given names